Municipal Inter College for Girls, Peshawar is a secondary school and intermediate college located in Peshawar, Khyber Pakhtunkhwa Pakistan. The college is affiliated with Board of Intermediate and Secondary Education, Peshawar for both Science and Arts courses of SSC and HSSC.

Overview 
Municipal Inter College for Girls is located at Shahi Bagh in Faqeerabad Peshawar. Arbab Niaz Stadium is located to the south while Peshawar Gymkhana Cricket Ground is located to the west of the college. The college was created and managed by district government Peshawar to provide quality education in English to the children of the employees of the Municipal Corporation, Peshawar and general public at affordable price.

See also 
 Shahi Bagh
 Government College Peshawar

References 

Schools in Peshawar